Regina Schermann (born 23 September 2004) is a Hungarian figure skater. She is a three-time Hungarian national silver medalist (2020–22) and has qualified to the final segment at two ISU Championships – the 2020 World Junior Championships and 2022 European Championships.

At the 2020 Youth Olympics, she won bronze in the team event and placed 12th in the individual event.

Personal life
Regina is the younger sister of artistic gymnast Bianka Schermann. Her role model is Alena Kostornaia.

Programs

Results
CS: Challenger Series; JGP: Junior Grand Prix

Detailed results 
Small medals for short and free programs awarded only at ISU Championships.

Senior results

Junior results

References 

Hungarian female single skaters
2004 births
Living people
Figure skaters at the 2020 Winter Youth Olympics
Sportspeople from Budapest
21st-century Hungarian women